Big UP Productions is an American film production company based in New York City who are particularly known for work in the area of rock climbing. The company is led by Josh Lowell, and films include titles such as: Rampage (1999), Dosage Volume 1 (2001), Pilgrimage (2003), Dosage Volume 2 (2004), Dosage Volume 3 (2005), and King Lines (2007).  Rock climbers profiled in Big UP Production films included leading names such as: Chris Sharma, Tommy Caldwell, and Tim Emmett.  In 2006, Big UP Productions and Sender Films received a Sports Emmy for "Outstanding Camera Work" for their work filming American climber Chris Sharma's first ascent of deep-water soloing route Es Pontas, in Mallorca Spain; it was part of the climbing film King Lines.

References

External links

Big Up Productions, MNTN Database (December 2021)

Film production companies of the United States
Mass media companies based in New York City